Bridget Jones: The Edge of Reason is a 1999 novel by Helen Fielding, a sequel to her popular Bridget Jones' Diary. It chronicles Bridget Jones's adventures after she begins to suspect that her boyfriend, Mark Darcy, is falling for a rich young solicitor who works in the same firm as him, a woman called Rebecca. The comic novel follows the characteristic ups and downs of the self-proclaimed singleton's first real relationship in several years. It also involves many misunderstandings, a few work mishaps, and an adventure in Southeast Asia involving planted drugs and Madonna songs.

In 2004, a film adaptation was released.

Fielding has said that the first Bridget Jones story was based on the Jane Austen novel Pride and Prejudice. There are parallels between The Edge of Reason and the Austen novel Persuasion, in which the main character is persuaded by her friends to break off her relationship with her "true love".  Again, Fielding borrows a name from Austen, this time a Giles Benwick, after Captain Benwick.  She also reworks several scenes in Persuasion: for example, Rebecca, Bridget's rival for Mark's affection, dives into a shallow river and hurts her foot, a mirror of the incident in Persuasion when Louisa, Anne's rival, falls on her head at Lyme. In both cases, the protagonist (Anne/Bridget) first overhears Darcy praising Rebecca/Louisa for being "resolute" - praise of the very trait that contributes to the accident. Then, when Bridget attends her goddaughter Constance's birthday party, Mark Darcy rescues her from a young male child who is determined to climb onto her back; in Persuasion, Captain Wentworth (Anne's lost love) does precisely the same thing, in the same manner, for Anne.  At Bridget's mother's Book Club poetry reading, Mark overhears Bridget commenting that women remain fixated on men who have forgotten them, and is moved to write her a secret note expressing his continuing regard (which he then fails to give to her due to a mix-up).  This, with a happier immediate outcome, also happens in Persuasion, when Wentworth overhears Anne making a similar observation about "women's constancy" to Captain Harville, and writes her a proposal which he gets to her by stealth.  Later in the Fielding novel, when Giles and Rebecca become romantically involved, Fielding parodies Austen's description of Captain Benwick and Louisa having fallen in love over poetry, commenting that Giles and Rebecca "fell in love over self-help books".

Much is made of Bridget's fascination with the BBC television adaptation of Pride and Prejudice and Colin Firth, the actor who played Mr. Darcy. Bridget even meets Colin Firth and interviews him for a newspaper article. As a self-referential in-joke, Colin Firth plays Mark Darcy in both Bridget Jones movies.

Tracie Bennett won an Audie Award for Comedy Best Actress for her audiobook narrations of both this and its predecessor.

Development
Sandra Gregory stated that the scenes involving the Thai prison probably received inspiration from her incident since Helen Fielding knew the next door neighbors of her parents and presumably would have talked to them.

References

External links

 Bridget Jones Online Archive

Bridget Jones
1999 British novels
British comedy novels
Chick lit novels
Novels by Helen Fielding
British novels adapted into films
Fictional diaries
Picador (imprint) books